The Trinidad and Tobago Classic, or commonly known as the TOYOTA Classic, is a knockout tournament for teams in Trinidad and Tobago's TT Pro League and National Super League. The football competition began in 2005, with TOYOTA as the primary sponsor, and is currently contested each October and November following the Pro League and Super League seasons.

The inaugural competition was contested between San Juan Jabloteh and W Connection, with the Savonetta Boys claiming their first title with a 1–0 win. United Petrotrin claimed the trophy in 2006, as well as, Joe Public capturing their first in 2007. San Juan Jabloteh took the trophy in 2008 with a win over St. Ann's Rangers in Hasely Crawford Stadium. Joe Public became the first club in 2009 to win the TOYOTA Classic twice. In 2010, Ma Pau won their first competitive trophy after defeating North East Stars in the Classic's first final decided on a penalty shootout. W Connection became the second club to win the Classic in 2011 by defeating Pro League newcomers T&TEC. North East Stars defeated Defence Force 4–2 on penalties after the match ended in a 2–2 draw in the 2012 final.

The current theme is It's a Hard Road to the Final and There Are No Free Rides, with the winner receiving TT$50,000 and the runners-up collecting TT$35,000.

Format
The knockout tournament begins in the first round with all TT Pro League teams automatically entering the competition. Following each National Super League season, the top eight teams in the final league table qualify and enter in the first round as well.

The draw for the first round is performed prior to the start of the tournament. The 16 teams in the competition, valued at TT$85,000 in total sponsorship, are drawn into four groups, all named after TOYOTA branded vehicles, Terios (Group A), Sirion (Group B), Delta (Group C), and Daihatsu (Group D) and are seeded based on their positions in their respective leagues. Clubs from the Super League look forward to meeting a Pro League team at home. Top-ranked teams look for easy opposition, but have to be on their guard against lower teams with ambition. 

All matches are played over two 45 minutes halves, and in the process the match is drawn at the end of regulation time, penalty kicks shall determine the winner.

Finals

Results

Results by team

References

External links
Official Website

  
Classic
Recurring sporting events established in 2005
2005 establishments in Trinidad and Tobago